The Southwest Chief (formerly the Southwest Limited and Super Chief) is a passenger train operated by Amtrak on a  route between Chicago and Los Angeles through the Midwest and Southwest via Kansas City, Albuquerque, and Flagstaff. Amtrak bills the route as one of its most scenic, with views of the Painted Desert and the Red Cliffs of Sedona, as well as the plains of Iowa, Kansas, and Colorado.

During fiscal year 2019, the Southwest Chief carried 338,180 passengers, an increase of 2.1% from FY 2018. The route grossed  in revenue during FY 2018, a 3.8% decrease from FY 2017.

History 

The Southwest Chief is the successor to the Super Chief, which was inaugurated in 1936 as the flagship train of the Atchison, Topeka and Santa Fe Railway. For most of its existence, it was "all-Pullman", carrying sleeping cars only. The Santa Fe merged the Super Chief with its all-coach counterpart, the El Capitan, in 1958. The merged train was known as the Super Chief/El Capitan, but retained the train numbers used by the Super Chief, 17 westbound and 18 eastbound.

Amtrak retained the Super Chief/El Capitan after taking over passenger rail service on May 1, 1971. During summer 1972, it was complemented by the Chief, reviving the name of another notable Chicago–Los Angeles sleeper train operated by the Santa Fe. Amtrak truncated the name to just Super Chief in 1973 and, on March 7, 1974, renamed it Southwest Limited after Santa Fe forced Amtrak to discontinue using the Chief brand on its former trains because of a perceived decline in quality after the Amtrak takeover. After subsequent improvements, the Santa Fe allowed Amtrak to change the name to Southwest Chief on October 28, 1984.

During 1997–98, Amtrak operated the Southwest Chief in conjunction with the Washington–Chicago Capitol Limited. The two trains used the same Superliner equipment sets, and passengers traveling on both trains could remain aboard during the layover in Chicago. Originally announced in 1996, Amtrak planned to call this through service National Chief and give it its own numbers (15/16), but the name and numbers were never used. Amtrak dropped the practice with the May 1998 timetable.

Accidents and incidents 
On October 2, 1979, the Southwest Limited derailed at Lawrence, Kansas. Of the 30 crew and 147 passengers on board, two were killed and 69 were injured. The cause was excessive speed on a curve. Underlying causes included the engineer's unfamiliarity with the route and speed restriction signage having been removed during track repairs.

While the lead locomotive stayed on the track, the three trailing locomotives, nine passenger cars, and seven baggage and mail cars derailed. All stayed upright. Of the 325 passengers and crew aboard, 154 were injured and none were killed.

On October 16, 1999, the westbound Southwest Chief suffered a minor derailment near Ludlow, California, following the Hector Mine earthquake. All the cars stayed upright, and four passengers were injured.

On March 14, 2016, the Southwest Chief derailed  from Cimarron, Kansas. Of 14 crew and 128 passengers, 20 were injured. Investigators determined the train derailed after the tracks were knocked out of alignment by a runaway truck from a nearby farm operation that had rolled down a hill and struck the tracks after its owners failed to secure the parking brake.

On June 27, 2022, the eastbound Southwest Chief derailed after striking a dump truck at a level crossing near Mendon, Missouri. Of 12 crew and 275 passengers, 3 deaths and 150 injuries have been reported; the driver of the truck also died.

Operations 
Unique among all long-distance Superliner trains, the Southwest Chief is permitted to run up to a maximum of  along significant portions of the route because of automatic train stop installed by the Atchison, Topeka and Santa Fe Railway.

During the spring and summer, Volunteer Rangers with the Trails and Rails program from the National Park Service travel on board and provide a narrative between La Junta, Colorado, and Albuquerque, New Mexico. Starting in May 2013, Volunteer Rangers with Trails and Rails will also be on board, providing a narrative between Chicago and La Plata, Missouri.

From June through August, the Southwest Chief is used by Boy Scouts traveling to and from Philmont Scout Ranch via the Raton station. During those months, Raton station is staffed by Amtrak employees and handles checked baggage.

This route was one of five studied for possible performance improvements by Amtrak in FY 2012.

Equipment 
A fourth Superliner coach may be added during peak travel periods. Usually a fourth coach is added and then removed in Kansas City, MO due to extra demand. Sometimes, private cars or deadhead cars can be seen riding along, also.

Route 
In 1979, the Southwest Chief's route between Kansas City and Emporia was shifted in order to maintain service to Topeka and Lawrence, which would otherwise have lost service when the Texas Chief was discontinued.

Following the merger of the Burlington Northern and the Santa Fe in 1996, BNSF constructed a connector track at Cameron, Illinois, which allowed freight and passenger trains to transfer between the BN Mendota Subdivision and the Chillicothe Subdivision.

In January 1994, the Southwest Chief was rerouted between San Bernardino and Los Angeles onto the Santa Fe Third District via Fullerton and Riverside. Previously, it served Pasadena and Pomona via the Santa Fe Pasadena Subdivision, which was closed to all through traffic following damage to a bridge over the eastbound lanes of Interstate 210 in Arcadia during the Northridge Earthquake.

There were plans to add service to Pueblo and connecting with the proposed Front Range regional rail service between Denver and Pueblo. It would have also run along former Colorado & Southern tracks through Walsenburg, reconnecting with its current alignment at Trinidad. A more recent plan is to run a section of the train to Colorado Springs, Colorado via Pueblo.

In May 2022, the Missouri General Assembly approved $1 million of state funds to establish a Southwest Chief infill station in Carrollton, between the Kansas City and Marceline stations. If approved by the governor, the state funds would have to be matched by local agencies.

Issues on midsection of route 

The part of the Southwest Chief's route in western Kansas, southeastern Colorado, and northeastern New Mexico faced uncertainty throughout the 2010s.

In 2010, BNSF said that Amtrak would have to pay for all track maintenance on the portion of the Southwest Chief's route between La Junta and Lamy, because BNSF does not run any freight trains over this segment.

In return, BNSF proposed rerouting the Southwest Chief from the affected sections of track to its Southern Transcon via Wichita, Amarillo, and Clovis—the same route once used by the San Francisco Chief. To avoid a reroute, Amtrak sought help from the affected states—Kansas, Colorado, and New Mexico. The states eventually contributed money toward rebuilding and rehabilitating the tracks—much of it obtained from federal transportation grants—and the route was not changed.

However, this same part of the Southwest Chief's route was threatened again in 2018 when it became the focal point of a struggle to determine whether to continue Amtrak as a national network or to operate regional stand-alone networks. The issue arose when Amtrak introduced new requirements for the third renewal grant and raised previously undiscussed technical issues. A letter dated May 31, 2018, co-signed by 11 Senators, condemned the action and urged providing the match. In an open letter, former Amtrak President and CEO Joseph H. Boardman said, "The Southwest Chief issue is the battleground whose outcome will determine the fate of American’s national interconnected rail passenger network".

In June, Amtrak announced that it was considering the replacement of rail service along the Kansas portion of the Southwest Chief with Amtrak Thruway Motorcoach buses between Albuquerque and Dodge City, where train service east to Chicago would resume. Senators in the affected area succeeded in offering an amendment to a funding bill. Per a press release from the office of co-sponsor Senator Jerry Moran, "This amendment would provide resources for maintenance and safety improvements along the Southwest Chief route and would compel Amtrak to fulfill its promise of matching funding for the successful TIGER IX discretionary grant ... In addition, this amendment would effectively reverse Amtrak’s decision to substitute rail service with bus service over large segments of the route through FY2019".

Ridership

Notes

References

External links 

 
 
 June 4, 2018 Colorado Southwest Chief & Front Range Passenger Rail Commission letter to Amtrak President and CEO Richard H. Anderson

1974 establishments in the United States
Amtrak routes
Higher-speed rail
Night trains of the United States
Passenger rail transportation in Illinois
Passenger rail transportation in Iowa
Passenger rail transportation in Missouri
Passenger rail transportation in Kansas
Passenger rail transportation in Colorado
Passenger rail transportation in New Mexico
Passenger rail transportation in Arizona
Passenger rail transportation in California
Long distance Amtrak routes